Elle Reeve (born Elspeth Reeve ; given name pronounced ) is an American journalist and correspondent for CNN. She previously worked for HBO's Vice News Tonight, where she won a Peabody Award for her coverage of the 2017 Unite the Right rally in Charlottesville, Virginia.

Career 
Reeve earned her Bachelor of Journalism degree at the Missouri School of Journalism in 2005.

In the 2000s, Reeve was a political editor at The Wire; later that decade she joined The New Republic, before being let go in December 2007 by her then-editor, Franklin Foer, due to her involvement in the Scott Thomas Beauchamp controversy. In Reeve's view, she was let go because Foer was simply "tired of dealing with the scandal". Reeve has also written articles which have appeared in The Atlantic and The Daily Beast.

Reeve covered the August 2017 Unite the Right rally in Charlottesville, Virginia for Vice News Tonight, during which she interviewed neo-Nazi Christopher Cantwell and other demonstrating white supremacists, capturing footage of them carrying tiki torches while chanting "Jews will not replace us!" which went viral. Her report, entitled Charlottesville: Race and Terror, earned both her and Vice News Tonight a Peabody Award, four Emmy Awards, and a George Polk Award.

In 2018, Fast Company included Reeve on their 2018 list of the "most creative people in business". She was also nominated in the journalist category at the tenth annual Shorty Awards.

, Reeve is a correspondent for CNN based in New York City.

Personal life
On December 31, 2018, Reeve married Jeremy Greenfield; She had previously been married to Scott Thomas Beauchamp (m. 2007). , Reeve resides in New York City.

References

External links
 Charlottesville: Race and Terror, news documentary for Vice News Tonight
 

1982 births
Living people
21st-century American women
American reporters and correspondents
American women journalists
CNN people
Missouri School of Journalism alumni
Peabody Award winners
Vice Media